Tanja Gönner (born 23 July 1969) is a German lawyer and politician of the Christian Democratic Union (CDU) who has been serving as managing director of the Federation of German Industries (BDI), the leading lobby organization of German industry.

Early life and education
Gönner was born 1969 in the West German town of Sigmaringen and studied law at the University of Tübingen.

Political career

Career in national politics
From 2002 to 2004 Gönner served as member of the Bundestag, representing the Zollernalb – Sigmaringen district. 

From 2000 to 2012, Gönner was part of the federal executive of the CDU, under leadership of the party’s chairwoman Angela Merkel.

Career in state government
In 2004, Gönner was appointed State Minister for Social Affairs in the government of Minister-President Erwin Teufel of Baden-Württemberg. In the subsequent governments of Ministers-President Günther Oettinger and Stefan Mappus, she served as State Minister of the Environment from 2005 to 2011. In this capacity, she notably defended the controversial Stuttgart 21 infrastructure project. 

In the negotiations to form a coalition government following the 2009 federal elections, Gönner was part of the working group on the environment, agriculture and consumer protection, led by Ilse Aigner and Michael Kauch.

In 2011, news media reported that Gönner was the preferred candidate of Chancellor Angela Merkel to succeed Matthias Kurth as president of the Federal Network Agency for Electricity, Gas, Telecommunications, Posts and Railway (BNetzA); after negotiations, however, Jochen Homann was eventually appointed.

Life after politics
From 2012 to 2022, Gönner served as chair of the board at GIZ.

Since June 2022, Gönner has been serving as Managing Director of the Federation of German Industries (BDI).

Other activities

Government bodies
 German Council for Sustainable Development (RNE), Member (since 2023, appointed ad personam by Chancellor Olaf Scholz)

Corporate boards
 VfB Stuttgart, Member of the Supervisory Board (since 2022)
 Fraport, Member of the Economic Advisory Board
 Stuttgart Airport, Chair of the Supervisory Board (2010–2011)

Non-profit organizations
 Energy and Climate Policy and Innovation Council (EPICO), Member of the Advisory Board (since 2021)
 World Vision Germany, Member of the Board of Trustees (since 2020)
 Stiftung Liebenau, Member of the Supervisory Board (since 2012)
 Agora Verkehrswende, Member of the Council
 Bundesverband der Unternehmervereinigungen (BUV), Member of the Advisory Board
 Institut der deutschen Wirtschaft, Member of the Presidium
 Quadriga Hochschule Berlin, Member of the Advisory Board on Politics and Public Affairs
 Tönissteiner Group, Member of the Board of Trustees
 WLSB-Sportstiftung, Member of the Board of Trustees
 Konrad Adenauer Foundation (KAS), Member of the Board of Directors
 Federal Academy for Security Policy (BAKS), Member of the Advisory Board (2018–2021)

References 

Living people
1969 births
Christian Democratic Union of Germany politicians